Karaoke Remix Vol.2 is a compilation album by the German Heavy metal group Helloween which features karaoke versions of Helloween classics from "Deris era".

It was only released in Japan.

Track listing 

Helloween compilation albums
1998 remix albums
1998 compilation albums